Opsilia schurmanni is a species of beetle from the family Cerambycidae that is endemic to North Macedonia.

References

Beetles described in 1971
schurmanni